This is a list of notable people from the Cranbrook Academy of Art, Bloomfield Hills, Michigan.

Notable alumni

Artists

Ceramics 
 Richard DeVore – ceramicist
 Leza McVey – studio potter
Annabeth Rosen - ceramic sculptor 
 Monica Rudquist – ceramic artist
 Stacy Jo Scott – ceramic artist, digital fabricator arts educator, writer
 Toshiko Takaezu – ceramic artist

Mixed media 
 Olga de Amaral – (B.F.A. Textiles)
 Nick Cave – fabric sculptor, performance artist
 Diana Guerrero-Maciá – visual artist
Anne Wilson – visual artist, mixed media

Painters 
 Marc Awodey – contemporary artist, painting and poetry
 Shiva Ahmadi – painter
 Frederic James – painter
 Judith Lodge – painter
 Fred Mitchell – painter

Printmakers and book artists 
 Walter Hamady – artist, book designer, papermaker
Stephanie Pogue - artist and art educator
 Roland Poska – papermaker, printmaker
 Ron Kowalke - artist and art educator

Sculptors 
 Susan Aaron-Taylor - sculptor
 Barbara Cooper – artist, sculptor
 Paul Granlund – sculptor
 Waylande Gregory – art-deco ceramics sculptors
 Duane Hanson – artist, sculptor
 Tony Rosenthal – sculptor
 Susan York – artist, sculptor

Designers

Architecture 
 Ed Bacon – urban planner, architect
 Peter Bohlin – architect
 Theodore Galante – architect
 James Hubbell – artist, architect, sculptor, founder of the Ilan-Lael Foundation 
 Fumihiko Maki – architect
 Gyo Obata - architect
 Ralph Rapson – architect
 Eero Saarinen – architect, industrial designer, and furniture designer. Designs include the Tulip group, Gateway Arch in St. Louis, Missouri and the main terminal of Dulles International Airport
 Joseph Allen Stein – architect
 Harry Weese – (Fellowship Urban Planning 1938–1939) architect
 Hani Rashid – (M.A. Architecture 1985) architect

Furniture design 
 Harry Bertoia – artist, sound art sculptor, modern furniture designer
 Charles Eames – architect, furniture designer; designer of the Eames Chair (see Ray Kaiser, below)
 Ray Kaiser Eames - abstract artist and furniture designer who married Charles Eames in 1941 and collaborated on most of the Eames designs
 Florence Knoll – architect, furniture designer
 Jay Sae Jung Oh – artist and furniture designer

Graphic design 
 Ed Fella – graphic designer, artist, educator
 Jeffery Keedy – graphic designer, type designer
 P. Scott Makela – graphic designer, type designer
 Nancy Skolos – (B.F.A. Design, 1977) graphic designer
 Lorraine Wild – (B.F.A. 1975) graphic designer

Industrial design 
 Niels Diffrient – ergonomics designer, industrial designer

Textile design 
 Ruth Adler-Schnee – (M.F.A. 1946) textile designer and first female architecture graduate student from Cranbrook
 Jack Lenor Larsen – (M.F.A. 1951) textile designer.
Bhakti Ziek – (M.F.A. Fiber, 1989) contemporary textile artist.
Carolyn Crump - 3D quilt maker

Other design 
 Chunghi Choo –  jewelry designer and metalsmith
 Wu Liangyong – urban planner

Notable faculty 
This is a list of both current and past notable faculty and visiting artist-in-residence, listed in alphabetical order by last name.
Marshall Fredericks – sculptor
Maija Grotell – ceramics
 Keith Haring – artist-in-residence and mural installation in 1987.
Ken Isaacs – head of the Design Department from 1956–1958, known for matrix-based modular system to build living structures.
 Daniel Libeskind – architect
Carl Milles – sculptor-in-residence
 Eliel Saarinen – Finnish architect known for his work with art nouveau buildings.

Presidents and directors 
 Eliel Saarinen, President, 1932–1946
Zoltan Sepeshy, President, 1946–1966
Glen Paulsen, President, 1966–1970
Wallace Mitchell, 1970–1977
 Roy Slade, 1977–1994
 Susana Torre, Director, 1994–1996
Gerhardt Knodel, Director, 1997–2007
Reed Kroloff, Director, 2007–2014
 Christopher Scoates, Director, 2014–2018
 Susan Ewing, Director, 2019–present

References

Cranbrook Academy of Art alumni
Cranbrook Academy of Art faculty